Amelanchier, also known as shadbush, shadwood or shadblow, serviceberry or sarvisberry (or just sarvis), juneberry, saskatoon, sugarplum, wild-plum or chuckley pear, is a genus of about 20 species of deciduous-leaved shrubs and small trees in the rose family (Rosaceae).

Amelanchier is native to temperate regions of the Northern Hemisphere, growing primarily in early successional habitats. It is most diverse taxonomically in North America, especially in the northeastern United States and adjacent southeastern Canada, and at least one species is native to every U.S. state except Hawaii and to every Canadian province and territory. Two species also occur in Asia, and one in Europe. The taxonomic classification of shadbushes has long perplexed botanists, horticulturalists, and others, as suggested by the range in number of species recognized in the genus, from 6 to 33, in two recent publications. A major source of complexity comes from the occurrence of hybridization, polyploidy, and apomixis (asexual seed production), making species difficult to characterize and identify.

The various species of Amelanchier grow to 0.2–20 m tall; some are small trees, some are multistemmed, clump-forming shrubs, and yet others form extensive low shrubby patches (clones).  The bark is gray or less often brown, and in tree species smooth or fissuring when older. The leaves are deciduous, cauline, alternate, simple, lanceolate to elliptic to orbiculate, 0.5–10 x 0.5–5.5 cm, thin to coriaceous, with surfaces above glabrous or densely tomentose at flowering, and glabrous or more or less hairy beneath at maturity. The inflorescences are terminal, with 1–20 flowers, erect or drooping, either in clusters of one to four flowers, or in racemes with 4–20 flowers. The flowers have five white (rarely somewhat pink, yellow, or streaked with red), linear to orbiculate petals, 2.6–25 mm long, with the petals in one species (A. nantucketensis) often andropetalous (bearing apical microsporangia adaxially). The flowers appear in early spring, "when the shad run" according to North-American tradition (leading to names such as "shadbush"). The fruit is a berry-like pome, red to purple to nearly black at maturity, 5–15 mm diameter, insipid to delectably sweet, maturing in summer.

Amelanchier plants are valued horticulturally, and their fruits are important to wildlife.

Selected species

For North American species, the taxonomy follows the Flora of North America; for Asian species the Flora of China; and for the one European species the Flora Europaea.

Amelanchier alnifolia – Saskatoon serviceberry, alder-leaved shadbush, saskatoon, saskatoon berry
Amelanchier arborea – downy serviceberry
Amelanchier asiatica – Korean juneberry or Asian serviceberry
Amelanchier australis
Amelanchier basalticola
Amelanchier bartramiana – mountain shadbush
Amelanchier canadensis – Canada serviceberry, shadblow serviceberry, bilberry, eastern shadbush, Indian pear
Amelanchier humilis – low shadbush
Amelanchier interior – Wiegand's shadbush
Amelanchier intermedia
Amelanchier laevis – smooth shadbush, smooth serviceberry, Allegheny serviceberry
Amelanchier lamarckii – Juneberry
Amelanchier nantucketensis – Nantucket serviceberry
Amelanchier obovalis – Southern Juneberry, Coastal serviceberry
Amelanchier ovalis – snowy mespilus
Amelanchier pallida – pale serviceberry or western serviceberry
Amelanchier parviflora
Amelanchier sanguinea – red-twigged shadbush or roundleaf serviceberry
Amelanchier sinica – Chinese serviceberry
Amelanchier spicata – low juneberry, thicket shadbush, dwarf serviceberry, or low serviceberry
Amelanchier stolonifera – running serviceberry
Amelanchier utahensis – Utah serviceberry

Garden hybrids
Since classifications have varied greatly over the past century, species names are often used interchangeably in the nursery trade. Several natural or horticultural hybrids also exist, and  many A. arborea and A. canadensis plants that are offered for sale are actually hybrids, or entirely different species. A. × grandiflora is another hybrid of garden origin, between A. arborea and A. laevis. The cultivar 'La Paloma' has gained the Royal Horticultural Society’s Award of Garden Merit.

A taxon called Amelanchier lamarckii (or A. x lamarckii) is very widely cultivated and naturalized in Europe, where it was introduced in the 17th century.  It is apomictic, breeding true from seed, and probably of hybrid origin, perhaps descending from a cross between A. laevis and either A. arborea or A. canadensis.  While A. lamarckii is known to be of North American origin, probably from eastern Canada, it is not known to occur naturally in the wild in North America.

Etymology

The origin of the generic name Amelanchier is probably derived from amalenquièr, amelanchièr, the Provençal names of the European Amelanchier ovalis.

The name serviceberry comes from the similarity of the fruit to the related European Sorbus.

A fanciful etymology explains the name 'serviceberry' by noting that the flowers bloom about the time roads in the Appalachian mountains became passable, allowing circuit-riding preachers to resume church services.  A similar etymology says that blooming serviceberry indicated the ground had thawed enough to dig graves, so burial services could be held for those who died in the winter when the only way to deal with the bodies was to allow them to freeze and wait for spring. Both of these fanciful etymologies are unlikely to be correct since the term is attested for both English and New World species as early as the 16th century, well before settlement of English North America, and serviceberry is far from unique in blossoming early in the year.

Juneberry refers to the fruits of certain species becoming ripe in June. The name saskatoon originated from a Cree noun  misâskwatômina (misāskwatōmina, misaaskwatoomina) for Amelanchier alnifolia. The city of Saskatoon, Saskatchewan, is named after this plant.

Shadberry refers to the shad runs in certain New England streams, which generally took place about when the trees bloomed.

Ecology
Amelanchier plants are preferred browse for deer and rabbits, and heavy browsing pressure can suppress natural regeneration. Caterpillars of such Lepidoptera as brimstone moth, brown-tail, grey dagger, mottled umber, rough prominent, the satellite, winter moth, and the red-spotted purple and the white admiral (both Limenitis arthemis), as well as various other herbivorous insects feed on Amelanchier. Many insects and diseases that attack orchard trees also affect this genus, in particular trunk borers and Gymnosporangium rust. In years when late flowers of Amelanchier overlap those of wild roses and brambles, bees may spread bacterial fireblight.

Uses and cultivation

The fruit of several species are excellent to eat raw, sweetish, and strongly accented by the almond-like flavour of the seeds. Selections from Amelanchier alnifolia have been chosen for fruit production, with several named cultivars. Other cultivars appear to be derived from hybridization between A. alnifolia and A. stolonifera. Propagation is by seed, divisions, and grafting. Serviceberries graft so readily that grafts onto other genera, such as Crataegus and Sorbus, are often successful.

The fruit can be harvested for pies, muffins, jams, and wine. The saskatoon berry is harvested commercially. One version of the Native American food pemmican was flavored by serviceberry fruits in combination with minced dried meat and fat.

The wood is brown, hard, close-grained, and heavy. The heartwood is reddish-brown, and the sapwood is lighter in color. It can be used for tool handles and fishing rods.  Native Americans used it for arrow shafts. Members of the Pit River Tribe would use the wood to create a sort of body armor, crafting it into a heavy robe or overcoat and corset armor worn during fighting.

Garden history
Several species are very popular ornamental shrubs, grown for their flowers, bark, and fall color. All need similar conditions to grow well, requiring good drainage, air circulation (to discourage leaf diseases), watering during drought, and soil appropriate for the species.

George Washington planted specimens of Amelanchier on the grounds of his estate, Mount Vernon, in Virginia.

References

External links
 Juneberry, in What Am I Eating? A Food Dictionary

 
Rosaceae genera
Plants used in Native American cuisine
Fruit trees